2009–10 FIS Alpine Ski Europa Cup was the 39th season of the FIS Alpine Ski Europa Cup.

Standings

Overall

Downhill

Super G

Giant Slalom

Slalom

Super combination

References

External links
 

FIS Alpine Ski Europa Cup